André Ibsen Rømer (born 18 July 1993) is a Danish professional footballer who plays as a defensive midfielder for Allsvenskan club IF Elfsborg.

Career

Midtjylland
Rømer started playing football for Køge Boldklub alongside his brother Marcel, before moving to the FC Midtjylland academy as a 15-year-old. In March 2012, Rømer signed a five-year contract with Midtjylland, and he was permanently promoted to the first team. He made his debut on 26 September 2012 in a 1–0 win over Rishøj Boldklub in the Danish Cup. Rømer made his Danish Superliga debut on 9 December 2012 in a 2–0 win over AC Horsens, where he came on as a substitute in the 90th minute for Petter Andersson. In total, Rømer made seven league appearances and played one cup match during the 2012–13 season. At the end of the season, he was also named "Newcomer of the Year" in Midtjylland.

Rømer scored his first goal on 18 April 2014 in a 4–0 win over AGF, after coming on as a substitute in the 85th minute. He played a total of 22 league matches and scored one goal, with an additional two cup appearances during the 2013–14 season. In October 2014, Rømer extended his contract with Midtjylland until the summer of 2019. He played 28 competitive matches and scored a goal during the 2014–15 season when Midtjylland became league champions. During the season, Rømer made his UEFA Europa League debut in the play-off round against Greek club Panathinaikos.

In the 2015–16 season, Rømer played 41 competitive matches and scored one goal. He played in the qualifying rounds for the UEFA Champions League and in the Europa League, where Midtjylland reached the round of 16 before they were knocked out by Manchester United. In September 2016, Rømer extended his contract with Midtjylland until 2021. In the 2016–17 season, he played 41 competitive matches and scored three goals. During the autumn of the 2017–18 season, Rømer played 11 competitive matches.

OB
On 4 January 2018, Rømer signed a three-and-a-half-year contract with league rivals OB. Rømer made his debut on 16 February 2018 in a 1–2 loss against FC Nordsjælland. He played 11 matches for the club during the 2017–18 season.

Randers
On 19 July 2018, Rømer moved to Randers FC on a three-year deal. Rømer played 35 competitive matches and scored five goals during the 2018–19 season. The following season, he played 34 competitive games and scored two goals. In the first six months of the 2020–21 season, before leaving the club, Rømer played 19 competitive matches and scored four goals.

IF Elfsborg
On 30 January 2021, Rømer signed a four-year contract with Swedish Allsvenskan club IF Elfsborg, where he signed a four-year contract starting 22 February. Rømer made his debut on 28 February 2021 in a 4–1 win over Utsiktens BK in the Swedish Cup, where he played alongside fellow Danes Jeppe Okkels and Frederik Holst.

Honours
Midtjylland
Danish Superliga: 2014–15

References

External links

Living people
1993 births
People from Køge Municipality
Danish men's footballers
Danish expatriate men's footballers
Association football defenders
Køge Boldklub players
FC Midtjylland players
Odense Boldklub players
Randers FC players
IF Elfsborg players
Danish Superliga players
Allsvenskan players
Danish expatriate sportspeople in Sweden
Expatriate footballers in Sweden
Sportspeople from Region Zealand